Jens Boalth (8 March 1725 – 5 December 1780) was a Norwegian educator. He was  Rector at the Bergen Cathedral School and a driving force behind cultural development in Bergen, Norway.

He was born in Christiania (now Oslo, Norway). He was the  son of  Larsen Boalth (1697–1744 and Anne Cathrine Pedersdatter Kolding (1695–1765).
He grew up in a wealthy merchant family and attended Christiania Cathedral School. In 1742, he entered the University of Copenhagen, where he relieved his theological degree in 1745  and took a Magister degree in 1750.

From 1756, he was  Rector at the Bergen Cathedral School. In total, he was an educator at the school for more than 20 years.
He co-founded the Bergen Philharmonic Orchestra in 1765 and  the Philharmonic Drawing School in 1772. In 1774, he founded Det nyttige Selskab, a service  society  which focused on the  well being of the general population.

References

1725 births
1780 deaths
Schoolteachers from Bergen
Heads of schools in Norway
People educated at Oslo Cathedral School
University of Copenhagen alumni